Daniel O'Reilly (born 11 April 1995) is an Irish footballer who plays for Hamilton Academical as a centre back.

Early life
O'Reilly was born in Dublin. He grew up in Celbridge and attended Salesian College Celbridge.

Club career 
O'Reilly played underage football for Cherry Orchard before being signed by Fulham Academy in November 2010 aged 15. On 30 January 2014, O'Reilly was sent to Walton Casuals on a one month loan. He stayed at Fulham in four years before being released, then had a brief stay at Southern Premier League Hereford United in 2014 before the club collapsed. He subsequently moved to Bishop's Stortford and then returned to Ireland to play with Bray Wanderers. After a brief period at Eastbourne Borough, O'Reilly returned in 2016 to the League of Ireland, playing with Longford Town and Finn Harps.

At the end of the 2019 season he was voted Supporter's Player of the Year at Finn Harps. In November 2019 O'Reilly signed for Shelbourne.

In December 2020 he moved to 2020 League of Ireland First Division Winners Drogheda United ahead of their first season back in the League of Ireland Premier Division, where he was voted Club Player of the Year in his only season at the club.

On 1 January 2022, Daniel’s agency (Stephen Hunt Management) announced that O'Reilly had signed for Scottish Championship side Hamilton Academical, after rejecting several offers from Ireland.

International career
O'Reilly was selected as an unused sub for the Republic of Ireland U17 team in 2012, in a qualifying game against Kazakhstan.

Career statistics

Honours

Individual
Longford Town
PFAI First Division Team of the Year: 2 (2017, 2018)

Finn Harps
Supporter's Player of the Year: 1 (2019)

Drogheda United
Supporter's Player of the Year: 1 (2021)

References

External links
Profile on Shelbourne F.C. website

1995 births
Living people
Republic of Ireland association footballers
Drogheda United F.C. players
Shelbourne F.C. players
Finn Harps F.C. players
Longford Town F.C. players
Bray Wanderers F.C. players
Hereford United F.C. players
Cherry Orchard F.C. players
Eastbourne Borough F.C. players
Bishop's Stortford F.C. players
People from Celbridge
League of Ireland players
Association football fullbacks
Association footballers from County Kildare
Scottish Professional Football League players
Hamilton Academical F.C. players
Republic of Ireland expatriate association footballers
Expatriate footballers in England
Irish expatriate sportspeople in England
Expatriate footballers in Scotland
Irish expatriate sportspeople in Scotland